Megaparia is a genus of bristle flies in the family Tachinidae. There is one described species in Megaparia, M. venosa.

Distribution
Mexico

References

Dexiinae
Diptera of North America
Tachinidae genera
Taxa named by Charles Henry Tyler Townsend
Monotypic Brachycera genera